The Great Eastern Main Line (GEML, sometimes referred to as the East Anglia Main Line) is a  major railway line on the British railway system which connects Liverpool Street station in central London with destinations in east London and the East of England, including , , ,  and .

Its main users are commuters travelling to and from London, particularly the City of London, which is served by Liverpool Street, and areas in east London, including the Docklands financial district via the London Underground and Docklands Light Railway connections at Stratford. The line is also heavily used by leisure travellers, as it and its branches serve a number of seaside resorts, shopping areas and countryside destinations. Trains from  also run into London via the GEML.

The Elizabeth line which fully opened in November 2022, operate services from Shenfield to London Paddington via Liverpool Street, connecting Essex to alternative areas in Central London.

History

Eastern Counties and Eastern Union Railways (1839–1862)

Both companies shared the same office, many directors and key staff, and started operating as a unified company with the EUR name from 1 January 1847.

In the late 19th century, the double-track main line was expanded with additional tracks being added to cope with more traffic.

Until 1860, trains serving the town of Ipswich used a station called  which was located south of the Stoke tunnel. The town's current station is located to the north of the tunnel.

The ECR had leased the EUR from 1854 but by the 1860s, the railways in East Anglia were in financial trouble and most were leased to the ECR; they wished to amalgamate formally, but could not obtain government agreement for this until 1862, when the Great Eastern Railway (GER) was formed out of the consolidation.

Great Eastern Railway (1862–1922)

The latter opened in stages from February 1874, beginning with the first four platforms, until it was fully open from November 1875. At that time the original 1840 Bishopsgate station closed to passengers and was converted into a goods yard.

These were followed by trains from Fenchurch Street in 1877. By 1882, these services had been extended and were terminating at Ilford, Romford or Brentwood.

In 1877, a fourth track was added between Bow Junction and Stratford and two goods-only tracks were added between Stratford and Maryland Point. The four-track Bow Junction to Stratford section was extended back to James Street Junction (near Globe Road station which opened the same year) in 1884, but Bethnal Green to James Street did not follow until 1891. It was also in this year that two extra tracks were added between Bethnal Green and Liverpool Street which were for the use of West Anglia Main Line services. These tracks were built through the basement warehousing associated with Bishopsgate station located above.

In 1903, the Fairlop Loop opened and a number of services that had previously terminated at Ilford were extended onto it. These services generally looped round and back to the GEML at Stratford (on the Cambridge line platforms).

London and North Eastern Railway (1923–1947)

The GER was grouped in 1923 into the London and North Eastern Railway (LNER). In 193132, the LNER quadrupled the tracks to Shenfield which became the terminus for inner-suburban operation.

The eastbound track extends as far as Ilford station.

Plans were drawn up in the 1930s to electrify the suburban lines from Liverpool Street to Shenfield at 1,500VDC and work was started on implementing this.

During World War II, the long-distance named trains were withdrawn, and these returned after the war with the reintroduction of the "Hook Continental" and "Scandinavian" boat trains to Harwich Parkeston Quay in 1945. The East Anglian (Liverpool Street – Norwich) was restored in October 1946, and in 1947 the "Day Continental" which pre-war had operated as the "Flushing Continental", recommenced operation.

British Railways (1948–1994)

After nationalisation in 1948, the GEML formed part of the Eastern Region of British Railways.

The Summer 1950 timetable saw the introduction of a regular interval service between Liverpool Street and Clacton, which left Liverpool Street on the half-hour and Clacton on the hour. Summer Saturdays in 1950 also saw the introduction of the "Holiday Camps Express" workings to Gorleston, near Lowestoft. The latter half of 1950 and early 1951 saw the testing of new EM1 electric locomotives for use over the Woodhead Line between Manchester and Sheffield.

January 1951 saw the introduction of the Britannia class 4-6-2 express locomotives and a speeding up of services on the GEML. However, not everyone was a fan; British Railways chairman Sir Michael Barrington Ward exclaimed "What? Send the first British Railways standard engines to that tramline? No!"

Twenty-three Britannias were allocated to the GE section and, in summer 1951, the Liverpool Street–Norwich service went over to an hourly clockface interval service.

The British Railways 1955 Modernisation Plan called for overhead line systems in Great Britain to be standardised at 25kVAC. However, due to low clearances under bridges, the route was electrified at 6.25kVAC. Extensive testing showed that smaller electrical clearances could be tolerated for the 25kV system than originally thought necessary. As a result, it was now possible to increase the voltage without having to either raise bridges or lower the tracks along the route to obtain larger clearances. The route between Liverpool Street and Southend Victoria was converted to 25kV AC between 1976 and 1980.

By the late 1970s, the costs of running the dated mechanical signalling systems north of Colchester was recognised and, in 1978, a scheme for track rationalisation and re-signalling was duly submitted to the Department of Transport.  This was followed by a proposal, in 1980, to electrify the Great Eastern Main Line.

The early 1980s saw track rationalisation and signalling work carried out in the Ipswich area and, on 9 April 1985, the first electric train consisting of two Class 305 electric multiple units (EMU) worked into Ipswich station. The previous year, another member of the class had been dragged to Ipswich by a diesel locomotive and was used for crew training. The first passenger carrying train was formed of British Rail Class 309 EMUs, which ran on 17 April 1985. The plan was for Inter-City trains to be hauled by British Rail Class 86 locomotives which, until the line beyond Ipswich to Norwich was electrified, would changeover with the Class 47s at Ipswich; this arrangement commenced from 1 May 1985.

During 1985–87, the line to Norwich was electrified and through electric working commenced in May 1987.

In 1986, the line as far as  became part of Network SouthEast, although some NSE services actually terminated at Ipswich, whilst longer-distance Norwich services were operated by InterCity. Local services operating from the Ipswich and Norwich areas were operated by Regional Railways.

The privatisation era (1994 onwards)

Between 1997 and 2004, services into Essex and some into Suffolk were operated by First Great Eastern, whilst services into Norfolk and other Suffolk services were operated by Anglia Railways. Between 2004 and 2012, services out of Liverpool Street, except for a limited number of c2c trains, were all operated by National Express East Anglia. Since 2012, the franchise has been operated by Abellio Greater Anglia; in May 2015, the Shenfield "metro" stopping service transferred to TfL Rail, as a precursor to Elizabeth Line services.

Liverpool Street IECC replaced signal boxes at Bethnal Green (closed 1997), Bow (closed 1996), Stratford (GE panel closed 1997), Ilford (closed 1996), Romford (closed 1998), Gidea Park (closed 1998), Shenfield (closed 1992) and Chelmsford (closed 1994). The system uses BR Mark 3 solid state interlockings, predominantly four-aspect signals and a combination of Smiths clamp-lock and GEC-Alsthom HW2000 point machines.

The first signal box to be closed and transferred to Liverpool Street IECC was Shenfield in 1992, which had only opened 10 years earlier. The last boxes to be transferred were at Romford and Gidea Park in 1998; these were the oldest of those being transferred, having been opened under the GER/LNER 1924 resignalling scheme.

Accidents and incidents
A number of fatal accidents have occurred on the line throughout its history:

 1840: ; four killed
 1872: ; one killed and 16 injured in a derailment
 1905: Witham; 11 killed and 71 injured in a derailment
 1913: ; three killed and 14 injured in a collision and derailment
 1915: Ilford; 10 killed and 500 injured in a collision between two trains
 1941: Brentwood; seven killed in a collision between two trains
 1944: Ilford; nine killed and 38 injured in a collision between two trains
 1944: ; one killed and three injured in a collision between two trains

Infrastructure 
The line is owned and maintained by Network Rail. It is part of Network Rail Strategic Route 7, which is composed of SRSs 07.01, 07.02 and 07.03, and is classified as a primary line. The GEML has a loading gauge of W10 between Liverpool Street and Haughley Junction (approximately 13 miles 63 chains north of Ipswich) and from there is W9 to Norwich.

The main line is electrified at 25 kV AC using overhead wires and comes under the control of Romford Electrical Control Room.

In addition, at the London-end of the depot, is Network Rail's Electrical Control Room that controls the supply and switching of the overhead line system for the whole of the former Anglia Region.

Signalling is controlled by two main signalling centres: Liverpool Street IECC (opened in 1992) and Colchester PSB (opened in December 1983). There are also several small signal boxes that control local infrastructure, such as Ingatestone box, which has jurisdiction over several local level crossings.

Line-side train monitoring equipment includes hot axle box detectors (HABD) on the down main and down electric lines near Brentwood (17 miles 35 chains from Liverpool Street) and on the up main near Margaretting (25 miles 78 chains). Other equipment includes wheel impact load detectors (WILD) ‘Wheelchex’ on the down main and up main west of Church Lane level crossing (24 miles 75 chains).

Track layout 

From Bethnal Green, the GEML has four lines to Bow junction, where there is a complex set of switches and crossings. A line from the LTS (Fenchurch Street) route joins the "up" (London-bound) electric and there are a further two lines, the "up" and "down" Temple Mills, giving access to the North London Line and Temple Mills.

At , the line to  diverges and the main line route drops from four tracks to two; this arrangement continues for the vast majority of the way to Norwich. There is also a short stretch of single track on approach to Norwich, as the line passes over the River Wensum on the Trowse Bridge.

Tunnel and viaducts 
Major civil engineering structures on the Great Eastern Main Line include the following:

Stoke tunnel
The only tunnel on the line is immediately south of  station. It was completed in 1846 and it is thought to be the earliest driven on a sharp continuous curve. During the excavation of the tunnel, many important fossils were discovered, including rhinoceros, lion and mammoth; the site was known as the "Stoke Bone Beds". The finds are considered important in understanding climate change during the Ice Age. This tunnel had the trackbed lowered so the line could accommodate taller freight trains.

Rolling stock 
Electric locomotive powered inter-city trains operated the London-Norwich service from electrification of the line in the mid-1980s until March 2020.

Class 86 locomotives powered the service from 1985 until 2005, with rakes of Mark 2 coaches. Push-pull services were introduced during their tenure, initially using a DBSO coach at the Norwich end and latterly with Driving Van Trailers, cascaded from the West Coast Main Line.

From 2004, Class 90 locomotives replaced the ageing Class 86s and rolling stock was updated with refurbished former West Coast Main Line Mark 3 coaches, following the introduction of the Class 390 ‘’Pendolino’’ stock on that route.

By March 2020, new  EMUs had fully replaced Class 90 and Mark 3 coaches; thereby ending locomotive operation on the inter-city services on the Great Eastern Main Line. Class 90s are still operating Freightliner services along with Class 66 and Class 70 diesels and Class 86 electrics.

Electric multiple units are used for inner and outer suburban passenger trains and diesel multiple units are used on non-electrified branch lines. Electric and diesel hauled freight services also operate on the Great Eastern Main Line. The main passenger units utilised are:

: 307 seats across four cars. Maximum speed . (Operated by Greater Anglia)
: 450 seats across nine cars. Maximum speed . (Operated by Elizabeth Line)
: 757 seats across 12 cars. Maximum speed . (Operated by Greater Anglia)
Class 720: 545 seats across five cars. . (Operated by Greater Anglia)
: 167 seats across three cars (class 755/3) or 229 seats across four cars (class 755/4). Maximum speed . (Operated by Greater Anglia)
On weekends and when engineering work occurs, c2c run services into Liverpool Street via Stratford using Class 357 electric multiple units (EMU).

Current developments

Crossrail

The first new  rolling stock entered service on the service on 22 June 2017. The new trains, built at Bombardier's Derby factory, provide air conditioned walk-through carriages, intelligent lighting and temperature control, closed-circuit television and passenger information displays showing travel information, including about onward journeys. It was planned that by September 2017, half of the services between Shenfield and Liverpool Street will have switched to the new Class 345 trains.

In November 2022, Crossrail services began to operate between Shenfield and London Paddington via Farringdon. However no services operate further than Paddington onto the likes of Heathrow Airport and Reading. Instead, these services start from Abbey Wood, The Elizabeth line's southeast branch.

Proposed developments

Services 
The majority of trains are operated by Abellio Greater Anglia, with the Elizabeth line operating the Liverpool Street to Shenfield stopping "metro" trains. A limited number of weekend (and when engineering work is planned) c2c services, operate on part of the line between Stratford and Liverpool Street.

Main line

Fast and semi-fast services utilise the main line between Liverpool Street and Shenfield. Branch lines diverge at Romford, Shenfield, Witham, Marks Tey, Colchester, Ipswich, Stowmarket and Norwich.

Additionally, a very limited number of main line services call at Ilford, Seven Kings and Gidea Park during early mornings and late nights, often for the convenience of drivers who may be working at these locations.

† Needham Market is not served by main line trains.

Electric line 
The Elizabeth line is a high-frequency service that operates between London Paddington and  via London Liverpool Street since 2022 and serves all stations.

In 2006 the off-peak stopping service on the Great Eastern Main Line consisted of six trains per hour, with some additional services during peak times. The line is mostly within Greater London, with two stations in the Essex borough of Brentwood.

Passenger volume
These are the passenger usage statistics from the year beginning April 2002 to the year beginning April 2013. Needham Market is the only station on the line that is not served by trains to/from London.

Notes

References

Further reading

 

Transport in the City of London
Transport in the London Borough of Newham
Transport in the London Borough of Barking and Dagenham
Transport in the London Borough of Havering
Transport in the Borough of Brentwood
Rail transport in Essex
Rail transport in Suffolk
Rail transport in Norfolk
Railway lines in the East of England
Railway lines in London
Railway lines opened in 1849
Electric railways in the United Kingdom
Main inter-regional railway lines in Great Britain
5 ft gauge railways in the United Kingdom
1849 establishments in England
25 kV AC railway electrification